Monticello Historic District may refer to:

Monticello Historic District (Monticello, Florida), listed on the NRHP in Florida
Monticello Historic Commercial District (Monticello, Kentucky), listed on the NRHP in Kentucky
Monticello Historic District (Monticello, Georgia), listed on the NRHP in Georgia